Maria Elaine Hadden is an American politician and community activist from Chicago. She is a member of the Chicago City Council, serving as alderperson for the city's 49th ward. She won election to that office after defeating 28-year incumbent Joe Moore in the 2019 aldermanic elections, and was reelected in 2023. The 49th ward includes most of Rogers Park and portions of West Ridge. She is a member of the Progressive Caucus, Black Caucus, and LGBT Caucus in the City Council.

Early life and education 
Hadden was born in Columbus, Ohio in 1981. She earned her bachelor's degree in international peace and conflict studies from the Ohio State University, and subsequently moved to Waukegan, Illinois to begin a job with the AmeriCorps VISTA program in 2003. She moved to Chicago in 2004. She later earned a master's degree in international public service management from DePaul University.

Early activist and political career 
Hadden was a founding board member of the Participatory Budgeting Project, where she worked from 2010 to 2018 to bring participatory budgeting to cities in the midwest and south. She later served as the executive director of the non-profit Our City Our Voice. She also served on the boards of directors of the non-profit Voqal and of Black Youth Project 100. She has been an active member of Network 49, an independent political organization based in Rogers Park, and of United Working Families.On January 20, 2018, Hadden announced her campaign to run for alderman in the 49th ward, which covers most of Rogers Park and portions of West Ridge. After the submission and processing of ballot petitions, Hadden and incumbent Joe Moore were the only candidates to make it on the ballot for the February 2019 election. Hadden's campaign emphasized development without displacement, funding local public schools, and supporting a strong local economy as key issues in the race. She received several endorsements from progressive activist groups, labor unions, and local politicians such Chuy García and David Orr. Although both candidates self-identified as progressives, observers and media outlets generally characterized Hadden as challenging Moore from the left. Hadden won the election on February 26, 2019, with 63% of the vote. She won a majority of the vote in 32 out of 33 precincts in the ward. With her win, Hadden is the first queer woman of color to be elected to the Chicago City Council. While Hadden is affiliated with the Democratic Party, she has said she would be an independent alderman. 

After her election, Hadden said that in her first few months in office, she would pursue a full assessment of infrastructure and services in the ward and set up an advisory committee for community engagement. On April 10, 2019, Hadden joined six other newly-elected members of the City Council in protesting against the approval of tax increment financing for the Lincoln Yards and The 78 real estate developments.

Chicago City Council (2019–present) 
Hadden was sworn in as a member of Chicago City Council on May 20, 2019.

City-wide issues

City budget 
Hadden was one of 11 aldermen who voted against Mayor Lori Lightfoot's proposed 2020 budget, alongside 8 other members of the progressive caucus. In a statement about her vote, Hadden stated, "I’m optimistic about the increased investments in housing, mental health care, homelessness prevention and concrete investments in the south and west sides of our city, but remain concerned that we haven’t exhausted all prospects of progressive revenue in order to take greater strides towards a budget that starts to repair decades of harm and inequity." Prior to the vote, Hadden spoke with constituents about the budget at multiple town hall meetings.

Public health 
Hadden sponsored a "senior safety" ordinance, in collaboration with the Jane Addams senior caucus, that was passed in July 2020. The ordinance requires building managers in senior housing to conduct regular wellness checks on residents.

Environmental issues 
Hadden was an early co-sponsor of legislation to ban single-use plastics and styrofoam in most restaurants.

Ward-level issues

Public health 
During the COVID-19 pandemic, Hadden coordinated with state representative Kelly Cassidy and local community groups to create the Rogers Park community response team. The team's stated goal is to help Rogers Park residents stay informed and access resources needed amid the social distancing and shelter-in-place measures in place during the crisis. They have offered informational resources online, set up a hotline for residents to request advice, and volunteers trained to safely deliver groceries and prescriptions.

In August 2021, Hadden pushed for the Chicago Park District to install life rings at lakefront beaches and parks, following a drowning death and ongoing efforts by neighborhood residents. The Park District installed life rings in Rogers Park in September 2021 and pledged to add additional devices along the lakefront in subsequent months.

Committees 
During the 2019–23 term, Hadden is a member of eight standing committees in the City Council: economic, capital, and technology development; ethics and government oversight; environmental protection and energy; housing and real estate; human relations and health; special events, cultural affairs, and recreation; zoning, landmarks, and building standards; and committees and rules.

Alliances and relationships 
After winning her seat in the first round of the 2019 elections, Hadden endorsed several candidates vying for City Council seats in the run-off elections: Andre Vasquez, who defeated Patrick J. O'Connor (40th ward); Jessica Gutierrez, who challenged Ariel Reboyras (30th ward); and two candidates ran in open races: Matt Martin (47th ward) and Robert Murphy (39th ward). She also announced support for other candidates in run-off elections who, like her, had been endorsed by United Working Families: Rossana Rodríguez Sanchez (33rd ward), Rafa Yañez (15th ward), and Jeanette Taylor (20th ward). She declined to make an endorsement in the 2019 mayoral election, citing her goal of being an independent alderman as well as strong support received by both run-off candidates in the 49th ward in the first round.

At the start of the 2019–2023 term, Hadden joined the City Council's Progressive Caucus, Black Caucus, and LGBT Caucus. She was selected as the treasurer for the Progressive Caucus. She has also pledged to join the council's Women's Caucus.

Personal life 
Hadden's longtime partner and spouse is Natalia Vera. Vera was elected as a member of the local school council for Joyce Kilmer Elementary School in Rogers Park in April 2018.

Electoral history

See also
List of Chicago aldermen since 1923

External links 

 Campaign website (archived pre-election victory version)
 Official aldermanic website

References 

1981 births
21st-century American politicians
African-American women in politics
Chicago City Council members
DePaul University alumni
American LGBT city council members
LGBT people from Illinois
Living people
Ohio State University alumni
People from Columbus, Ohio
Women city councillors in Illinois
Illinois Democrats
African-American city council members in Illinois
21st-century American women politicians
21st-century African-American women
21st-century African-American politicians
20th-century African-American people
20th-century African-American women